Piper lucigaudens is a species of plant in the family Piperaceae. It is endemic to Panama.  It is threatened by habitat loss.

References

Flora of Panama
lucigaudens
Near threatened plants
Taxonomy articles created by Polbot